Everett (anglicization of the Gaelic Eibhearard) is a surname and may refer to:

Entertainers 
 Betty Everett (1939–2001), American soul singer, famous for her song It's In His Kiss (The Shoop Shoop Song)
 Bridget Everett (born 1972), American comedian
 Chad Everett (1936–2012), American actor
 Dylan Everett (born c. 1995), Canadian actor
 Geoff Everett, British Guitarist and vocalist
 Kenny Everett (1944–1995), popular British entertainer
 Mark Oliver Everett (born 1963), US musician, founder of Eels
 Rupert Everett (born 1959), British actor

Politics and government 
 A. Catherine Everett, Manitoba, Canada judge 
 Alexander Hill Everett (1792–1847), American diplomatist, politician and man of letters
 Alfred Hart Everett (1848–1898), British colonial administrator and naturalist
 Edward Everett (1794–1865), American politician
 Fats Everett (1915–1969), American politician
 Garth Everett (1954-2023), American attorney and politician
 James Everett (1889–1967), senior Irish politician
 Ralph B. Everett (born 1951), president and chief executive officer of the Joint Center for Political and Economic Studies
 Robert Ashton Everett (1915–1969), American politician
 Robert W. Everett (1839–1915), American representative from Georgia
 Robinson O. Everett (1928–2009), American lawyer and judge
 Ron Everett, aka Maulana Karenga (born 1941), US political activist and social scientist
 Terry Everett (born 1937), American politician
 William Everett (1839–1910), American politician

Sports 
 Adam Everett (born 1977), American baseball player
 Allan Everett (born 1913), Australian rules footballer
 Carl Everett (born 1971), American baseball player
 Danny Everett (born 1966), American runner
 Dudley Everett (1912–1943), Australian cricketer
 Gerald Everett (born 1994), American football player
 Harold Everett (1891–1979), English cricketer
 Jim Everett, (born 1963), American football player
 Jim Everett (Australian footballer) (1884–1968), Australian rules footballer
 Kevin Everett (born 1982), American football player
 Neil Everett (born 1962), US sports announcer
 Robert W. H. Everett (1901–1942), British jockey

Other people 
 Alexander Everett (1921–2005), British self-improvement and personal development consultant
 Alfred Hart Everett (1848–1898), British civil servant in Borneo and naturalist.
 Bill Everett (1917–1973), American comic book writer
 Daniel Everett (born 1951), American linguistics professor
 Elizabeth Hawley Everett (1857-1940), American suffragist, author, and academic
 Frank Everett (1861–1920), Washington state pioneer and businessman
 H. D. Everett (1851–1923), British female novelist 
 Hugh Everett III (1930–1982), US physicist, quantum mechanics theorist
 John R. Everett  (1918–1992), American college president
 Joseph David Everett (1831–1904), English physicist, professor, and writer
 Julian F. Everett (1869–1955), American architect
 Minnie Everett (1874–1956), Australian ballet and operetta producer
 Percival Everett (born 1956), American novelist
 Robert Everett (computer science) (born 1921), computer scientist (MIT, Mitre)
 Roberta Everett (1906–1979), English artist
 Raymond Everett Lisle (1910–1994), American attorney, officer in the US Foreign Service, and Dean of Brooklyn Law School

Fictional characters
 Lee Everett, the playable character in the video game The Walking Dead
 Morgan Everett, character in the video game Deus Ex

See also
John Everet, highwayman in Everet v Williams, 1700s English court case about contracts to commit crimes
Evert, surname

English-language surnames
Surnames from given names